The 1946 Hardin–Simmons Cowboys football team was an American football team that represented Hardin–Simmons University in the Border Conference during the 1946 college football season. The 1946 season marked Hardin–Simmons' return to football after a three-year hiatus during World War II. In its third season under head coach Warren B. Woodson, the Cowboys compiled a perfect 11–0 record, outscored opponents by a total of 332 to 48, won the Border Conference championship, and defeated Denver in the 1947 Alamo Bowl. 

The Cowboys ranked second nationally in rushing offense with an average of 290.6 rushing yards per game during the regular season. They ranked sixth nationally in total offense with an average of 359.4 yards per game.  They also ranked seventh nationally in total defense, giving up only 167.3 yards per game during the regular season.

Halfback Rudy Mobley led the nation with 1,262 rushing yards during the regular season. He added 142 rushing yards and two touchdowns in the Alamo Bowl, bringing his 11-game season total to 1,404 rushing yards.

Schedule

After the season

The 1947 NFL Draft was held on December 16, 1946. The following Cowboys were selected.

References

Hardin-Simmons
Hardin–Simmons Cowboys football seasons
Border Conference football champion seasons
Hardin-Simmons Cowboys football